= Geragathe =

Coordinates: 40°48′42″N 29°56′42″E

Geragathe was an inland town of ancient Bithynia inhabited during Byzantine times.

Its site is located north of İzmit in Asiatic Turkey.
